Neofriseria is a genus of moths in the family Gelechiidae.

Species
Neofriseria baungaardiella Huemer & Karsholt, 1999
Neofriseria caucasicella Sattler, 1960
Neofriseria kuznetzovae Bidzilya, 2002
Neofriseria mongolinella Piskunov, 1987
Neofriseria peliella (Treitschke, 1835)
Neofriseria pseudoterrella (Rebel, 1928)
Neofriseria sceptrophora (Meyrick, 1926)
Neofriseria singula (Staudinger, 1876)
Neofriseria turkmeniella Piskunov, 1987

Former species
Neofriseria amseli Povolný, 1981 (now in Parapsectris)
Neofriseria similis Povolný, 1981 (now in Parapsectris)

References

 
Gelechiini